Jiavan (also Romanized as Jīāvān and Jeyāvān; also known as Dzhiavan and Jīāravān) is a village in Fuladlui Jonubi Rural District, Hir District, Ardabil County, Ardabil Province, Iran. At the 2006 census, its population was 226, in 47 families.

References 

Towns and villages in Ardabil County